Squash at the 2002 West Asian Games was held at the Qadsia Club, Kuwait City, Kuwait from 4 to 9 April 2002.

Medalists

Medal table

References

Official website

External links
Olympic Council of Asia - 2002 West Asian Games

West Asian Games
2002 West Asian Games